Sweet Dreams or Sweet Dream may refer to:

Music

Albums
 Sweet Dreams (Are Made of This) (album), by Eurythmics, or the title song (see below)
 Sweet Dreams (Sword album)
 Sweet Dreams (soundtrack), from the 1985 film (see below)
 Sweet Dreams: The Anthology, by Roy Buchanan
 Sweet Dreams (La Bouche album), 1995 (for the title song see below)
 Sweet Dreams, by BZN

Songs
 "Sweet Dreams (Are Made of This)" by Eurythmics, also covered by Marilyn Manson
 "Sweet Dreams" (Air Supply song)
 "Sweet Dreams" (Alan Walker and Imanbek song)
 "Sweet Dreams" (Beyoncé song)
 "Sweet Dreams" (Don Gibson song), notable as a hit for Patsy Cline, as well as other covers such as Roy Buchanan's.
 "Sweet Dreams" (La Bouche song)
 "Sweet Dreams" (Vamps song)
 "Sweet Dreams", by Split Enz from Second Thoughts
 "Sweet Dreams", by Elvis Costello and the Attractions from Almost Blue
 "Sweet Dreams", by Tori Amos from Tales of a Librarian
 "Sweet Dreams", by Yes from Time and a Word
 "Sweet Dreams", by Holly Miranda from The Magician's Private Library
 "Sweet Dreams", by Probot from their eponymous album
 "Sweet Dreams", by Børns from Blue Madonna
 "Sweet Dreams!", by Exo-CBX from Blooming Days
 "Sweet Dreams", by Swing feat. Dr. Alban, 1995
 "Sweet Dream" (Alessia Cara song)
 "Sweet Dream" (Jethro Tull song)
 "Sweet Dream" (Universe Cowards song)
 "Sweet Dream", by Greg Page from his 1998 debut album
 "Sweet Dream", an English language version of the song "Sweet Sweet Sweet" by the Japanese pop group Dreams Come True, from their album The Swinging Star

Performers
 Sweet Dreams (1970s band), a UK group that had a hit with a cover of ABBA's "Honey, Honey"
 Sweet Dreams (1980s band), a UK group in the 1983 Eurovision Song Contest

Film and television
 Sweet Dreams (1981 film) or Sogni d'oro, a film directed by and starring Nanni Moretti
 Sweet Dreams (1985 film), a film based on the life of Patsy Cline
 Sweet Dreams (1996 film), a television film starring Tiffani-Amber Thiessen
 Sweet Dreams (2012 film), a documentary about a women's drumming troupe in Rwanda
 Sweet Dreams (2016 film), an Italian film directed by Marco Bellocchio
 Strawberry Shortcake: The Sweet Dreams Movie, a 2006 computer-animated film
 "Sweet Dreams" (Frasier), a 1998 television episode
 "Sweet Dreams" (Glee), a 2013 television episode
 "Sweet Dreams" (Merlin), a 2009 television episode
 "Sweet Dreams" (Roseanne), a 1989 television episode
 Sweet Dreams, a 2000–2008 Food Network program hosted by Gale Gand

Literature
 Sweet Dreams (Dennett book), a book by Daniel Dennett
 Sweet Dreams (novel), a novel by Michael Frayn
 Sweet Dreams (novel series), a series of teen romance novels
 Sweet Dreams, a story collection by Sunny Leone

Other
 Sweet Dreams (aircraft) - The sole Pereira (Osprey ) GP-5 Unlimited/Super-sport class racing aircraft
 Sweet Dreams, a video game by Hanako Games